Edward "Eddie" Gibbins (24 March 1926 – 7 August 2011) was an English professional footballer who played for Finchley and Tottenham Hotspur. He was born in Shoreditch and died in Kingston St Mary.

Football career
Gibbins joined Tottenham Hotspur from non-league club Finchley in September 1946. The centre half played four senior matches in all competitions for the Lilywhites between 1952 and 1953.

Following his retirement, Gibbins managed local London based sides Edmonton, Hounslow and Hayes.

Post–football career
Gibbins was employed by a fuel transport company based in Tottenham up to his retirement. In recent years he had lived in Taunton before his death at a nursing home on 7 August 2011 in Kingston St Mary. One of Gibbins' sons, Roger, later joined Tottenham before going on to make over 400 appearances in the Football League.

References

1926 births
2011 deaths
Footballers from Shoreditch
English footballers
English Football League players
Tottenham Hotspur F.C. players
Association football defenders
Finchley F.C. players
Chelmsford City F.C. players
Hounslow F.C. managers
Hayes F.C. managers
English football managers